This is a list of people who served as Lord Lieutenant of Ayrshire and Arran, Scotland.

The first Lord Lieutenant, Sir Bryce Knox, had previously been Lord Lieutenant of Ayrshire. By virtue of the Lord Lieutenants Order 1975 he became Lord Lieutenant for the districts of Cunninghame, Kilmarnock and Loudoun, Kyle and Carrick and Cumnock and Doon Valley in Strathclyde Region.  By virtue of the Lord-Lieutenants (Scotland) Order 1996 the lieutenancy area was renamed as Ayrshire and Arran.

References

Ayrshire and Arran
East Ayrshire
North Ayrshire
South Ayrshire
Isle of Arran